The 2013 IHF Men's Junior World Championship was the 19th edition of the tournament and was held in Bosnia and Herzegovina from 14 – 28 July 2013.

The Oceania Continent Handball Federation withdrew from the tournament.

Host cities
Bosnia and Herzegovina was awarded hosting rights in May 2011, at the IHF XXXIII Ordinary Congress in Marrakech, Morocco. After long negotiations with local government, four cities were chosen to host the competition: capital Sarajevo with two halls and Banja Luka, Ljubuški and Zenica with one hall each.

Qualified teams
Africa

Americas

Asia

Europe
 (host)

 (replaced team from Oceania)

Oceania
Oceania gave up their spot, a team from Europe (Serbia) replaced its spot.

Preliminary round
24 teams were drawn into four groups of six teams each. The draw was made in Sarajevo on 19 April 2013. The top four teams from each group advance to the Round of 16. The match schedule was released on May 16.

All times are local (UTC+2).

Group A

Group B

Group C

Group D

Knockout round

Championship

Round of 16

Quarterfinals

Semifinals

Third place game

Final

5–8th place playoff

5–8th place semifinals

Seventh place game

Fifth place game

9–16th place playoff

9–16th quarterfinals

9–12th semifinals

Eleventh place game

Ninth place game

13–16th place playoff

13–16th place semifinals

15th place game

13th place game

President's Cup

17–20th place playoff

17–20th place semifinals

19th place game

17th place game

21–24th place playoff

21st–24th place semifinals

23rd place game

21st place game

Final standings

All-star team
Goalkeeper: 
Left wing: 
Left back: 
Pivot: 
Centre back: 
Right back: 
Right wing:

References

External links
IHF Site

2013 in handball
Men's Junior World Handball Championship
International sports competitions hosted by Bosnia and Herzegovina
2013
July 2013 sports events in Europe
Sport in Zenica
Sport in Banja Luka
Sport in Ljubuški
Sports competitions in Sarajevo
2013 Men's Junior World Handball Championship